The New Zealand national cricket team toured the West Indies from 8 June to 6 July 2014, playing a three-match Test cricket series and two T20I matches against the West Indies team. 

West Indies batsman Chris Gayle played in his 100th Test match in the 1st Test. In that match, Gayle became the seventh West Indian cricketer to pass 7,000 runs in Test cricket. It was New Zealand's first series win away from home against a top-eight nation in 12 years.

Squads

Tour matches

Two-day match: Jamaica Select XI v New Zealanders

Three-day match: Jamaica Select XI v New Zealanders

Test series

1st Test

2nd Test

3rd Test

T20I series

1st T20I

2nd T20I

References

External links
 Series homepage at ESPN Cricinfo
 Series page on Wisden India

204
International cricket competitions in 2014
New Zealand
2014 in West Indian cricket
2014 in New Zealand cricket